WSBE-TV (channel 36), branded on-air as Rhode Island PBS, is a PBS member television station licensed to Providence, Rhode Island, United States, serving the entire state as well as Bristol County, Massachusetts. The station is owned by the Rhode Island PBS Foundation, a non-profit organization. WSBE-TV's studios are located on Park Lane in Providence, and its transmitter is located on Pine Street in Rehoboth, Massachusetts.

History
The station began broadcasting on June 8, 1967 from the campus of Rhode Island College. In 1974, WSBE moved to the former WPRO-TV (now WPRI-TV) facilities at 24 Mason Street in Providence. In January 1991, WSBE moved to new studios on 50 Park Lane in Providence, near the Cranston city line. Its analog transmitter was located on Neutaconkanut Hill in Johnston, until the FCC-mandated digital conversion in 2009. From 1973 to 2000, WSBE-TV's programming was relayed in Westerly on translator W62AB. This translator was turned off in 2000, largely because of the high penetration of cable in the state. On May 1, 2003, WSBE rebranded itself as Rhode Island PBS.

WSBE-TV's license was originally held by the Rhode Island State Board of Education (from which the call letters are derived). In 1981, what had become the Board of Regents for Education transferred the station to the Rhode Island Public Telecommunications Authority, a quasi-state agency. The Channel 36 Foundation was founded in 1987 as an independent fundraising arm of WSBE; it subsequently became the Rhode Island PBS Foundation following the station's 2003 rebranding. In June 2012, the Rhode Island Public Telecommunications Authority voted to begin the process of transitioning WSBE-TV from a state licensee to a community licensee, with the Rhode Island PBS Foundation assuming full control of the station. According to a release announcing the decision, the state budget extended funding to the station until the end of the fiscal year on June 30, 2013. The license transfer was completed on October 10, 2012.

Programming

WSBE airs well-known PBS series (Nature, Masterpiece, Antiques Roadshow), on typically no less than an eight-day delay from common carriage public television stations such as Boston's WGBH-TV. WSBE has differentiated its on-air schedule by including independent local and national productions, and content from program distributors American Public Television (APT), National Educational Telecommunications Association (NETA) and Executive Program Services. "Destination viewing" (content that draws a loyal audience week after week) includes The Lawrence Welk Show, Doc Martin, opera specials, and a Tuesday night rotation of "Britcoms" from the BBC, including Are You Being Served?, Last of the Summer Wine, As Time Goes By, Vicar of Dibley, Keeping Up Appearances, and several others. WSBE-DT2 airs a schedule similar to WGBH-TV in Boston.

WSBE co-produces the nationally distributed Italian cooking show, Ciao Italia.

Local content produced by WSBE includes:
A Lively Experiment, WSBE's flagship political affairs show, discusses Rhode Island (and occasionally national) politics among a revolving panel of news makers and opinion leaders. From its premiere episode until September 15, 2005, the show's moderator was professional radio broadcaster Steve Kass, until Kass resigned in to join Governor Donald Carcieri's administration. James Hagan, former president of the Greater Providence Chamber of Commerce, moderated the show from 2006 until Dyana Koelsch took over in 2011. A public relations consultant, Koelsch was a former television journalist. On September 23, 2016, Jim Hummel became the program's fourth permanent moderator. Hummel is executive director and senior investigator of The Hummel Report. Known for his WLNE-TV/ABC6 You Paid for It segments, Jim Hummel spent 13 years as chief reporter for ABC6, and 13 years at The Providence Journal. In his career, Hummel earned the Radio and Television News Directors Association’s prestigious Edward R. Murrow Award for Investigative Reporting.
Our Town, a Rhode Island PBS community project. The purpose is to share the charm and character of Rhode Island towns and villages - in particular, untold or uncelebrated stories that capture the essence of life in the town. The stories are selected, written, filmed, and narrated by resident and volunteer storytellers and videographers. Rhode Island PBS weaves together the independent segments into a feature-length documentary. 
Rhode Island Classroom explores the technology, lessons, and people who are making the grade in Rhode Island's K-12 classrooms. The half-hour quarterly series introduces stand-out teachers who are inspiring students, break-through courses offered in area schools, and new, exciting programs that are motivating students to succeed.

Recent series not currently in production: 
Now available online only, GED Connection is an education series for people preparing for their general equivalency diploma, or GED. The instructional and practice testing series is available in cooperation with the Adult Education division of the Rhode Island Department of Elementary and Secondary Education.
The Thirteenth State, a public affairs show that covered topics of interest from the airport expansion to zoo exhibits. The show title honors Rhode Island's independent position as the first of the 13 colonies to renounce allegiance to King George, and the last of the 13 colonies to ratify the Constitution. 
BestSellers, a book review and author interview program.
Justice Matters, a monthly show on Rhode Island law with the Chief Justice of the Rhode Island Supreme Court. 
New England Portrait, a series about people and places of local interest.
Costantino's Round Table features chefs, restaurateurs, vintners, and other professionals and experts from the Rhode Island food and tourism industry.
Today's Rhode Island National Guard, a look at the role of the state's National Guardsmen

Technical information

Subchannels
The station's digital signal is multiplexed:

Analog-to-digital conversion
On January 16, 2009, the analog transmitter for WSBE suffered a "catastrophic failure". The old RCA transmitter developed a leak in the water cooling system. Due to the scarcity of parts, time required to repair (two weeks minimum), cost, and the proximity to the original February 17 date for the analog shutdown, the station discontinued regular programming on its analog signal, over UHF channel 36, at that time. The station's digital signal remained on its pre-transition UHF channel 21 on February 18, 2009, using PSIP to display the station's virtual channel as its former UHF analog channel 36.

References

External links
Official website
UHF Morgue: W62AB
History of WSBE-TV

SBE-TV
PBS member stations
Television channels and stations established in 1967
1967 establishments in Rhode Island
Mass media in Providence, Rhode Island